Botanical gardens in Malaysia have collections consisting entirely of Malaysia native and endemic species; most have a collection that include plants from around the world. There are botanical gardens and arboreta in all states and territories of Malaysia, most are administered by local governments, some are privately owned.
 Cameron Highlands Botanical Park, Cameron Highlands
 Labuan Botanical Garden, Labuan
 Malacca Botanical Garden, Malacca
 Penang Botanic Gardens, Penang
 Kuching Aquarium and Botanical Garden, Kuching
 Putrajaya Botanical Garden, Putrajaya
 Perdana Botanical Gardens, Kuala Lumpur
 Rimba Ilmu Botanical Gardens, Kuala Lumpur
 Taiping Botanical Gardens, Taiping
 UMS Botanical Garden, Kota Kinabalu
 Zaharah Botanical Gardens, Johor Bahru
 Johor Botanical Garden, Sri Medan, Johor
 National Botanical Garden Shah Alam, Shah Alam, Selangor Darul Ehsan

References

External links
Botanical Gardens in Malaysia 

Malaysia
Botanical gardens